Christopher C. Hall (born 1985) is the Iowa State Representative from the 13th District.  A Democrat, he has served in the Iowa House of Representatives since 2011.  Hall was born and lives in Sioux City, Iowa.  He has a B.A. in political science from Grinnell College.

, Hall serves on several committees in the Iowa House – the Commerce and Natural Resources committees.  He also serves as the ranking member of the Appropriations committee.

Electoral history
*incumbent

References

External links

 Representative Chris Hall official Iowa General Assembly site
 
 Financial information (state office) at the National Institute for Money in State Politics

1985 births
Living people
Grinnell College alumni
Democratic Party members of the Iowa House of Representatives
Politicians from Sioux City, Iowa
21st-century American politicians